Leatherface were a British punk rock band from Sunderland, Tyne and Wear, fronted by Frankie Stubbs. Trouser Press called them "England's finest, most exciting punk band of the 90s" and The Guardian has called them "the greatest British punk band of the modern era."

History and background
Formed in August 1988 by Frankie Stubbs and Dickie Hammond (also of HDQ), Leatherface released four full-length albums before their initial split in 1993. Third album Mush was, according to Allmusic, "one of the most intense records of the 90s, with some of the fiercest playing and song dynamics.. considered one of the best albums of the decade."

The band split in late 1993, – releasing a posthumous mini album (The Last) the following year – but reformed in 1998, after the death of bass player Andy Crighton (also of Snuff). Four more albums followed between 1999 and 2012.

Leatherface's music has been described as a cross between Hüsker Dü and Motörhead, a notable element being Stubbs' rasping, "gravelly" vocals. The lyrics often feature far-fetched similes, metaphors, word play and obscure allusions. Though never attaining much more than a cult following outside their native country, the band have been cited as an influence by higher-profile punk acts such as Hot Water Music and Dillinger Four.

Rubber Factory Records released a tribute album to Leatherface in 2008, featuring 41 tracks by over 35 artists from several different countries who were influenced by the band, including Hot Water Music and The Sainte Catherines.

Their cover of "Can't Help Falling In Love With You" was played in the final episode of Sons of Anarchy.

Post-split

Frankie Stubbs

After Leatherface split in 1993, Stubbs moved on to two new bands, Jesse and Pope. Jesse released three singles and one self-titled album between 1995 and 1998. Stubbs also performed solo and released one single in 1995 and a 10’’ EP in 2001. In addition Stubbs has produced records for almost 40 other (mostly) UK bands including China Drum, Four Letter Word, Drive, Hooton 3 Car, Midway Still, Monkhouse, Snuff and Wat Tyler.

Stubbs was featured on Duncan Redmonds' 2009 collaboration album Bubble and Squeak on four tracks alongside Redmonds, Loz Wong (Snuff) and Wes Wasley (Consumed, Billy No Mates) calling themselves "The Pissmops". He was referenced in Franz Nicolay's song "Frankie Stubbs Tears".

'Heart is Home' was among the first four VinylVideos ever produced.

Frankie Stubbs is a supporter of Sunderland A.F.C.

Other members
Graeme Philliskirk & Dickie Hammond went on to form Medictation with the remaining members consisting of members from Montreal, Quebec based band The Sainte Catherine's. Their debut LP Warm Places was released in 2016. Hammond died in October 2015.

David Lee Burdon has spent time occupying various roles in such outfits as Former Cell Mates, Anchor Bends and most recently forming D L Burdon & His Questionable Intentions with Omar Zehery (Hit The Lights, Trophy Girls) and Craig Dickman (Shitty Neighbors).

Discography

Albums
 Cherry Knowle (1989), Meantime Records
Fill Your Boots (1990), Roughneck Records
Mush (1991), Roughneck Records
Minx (1993), Roughneck Records
The Last (1994), Domino Recording Company (mini-LP)
BYO Split Series, Vol. 1 (1999), BYO Records, (Split LP with Hot Water Music)
Horsebox (2000), BYO Records
Dog Disco (2004), BYO Records
The Stormy Petrel (2010), Big Ugly Fish Recordings/No Idea Records/Poison City Records/Punk in Ya Face Records

Compilation and live albums
Live in Oslo (1995), Rugger Bugger Discs
Discography Part One (1998), Rejected Records
Discography Part Two (1998), Rejected Records
Your Choice Live Series (1995) Your Choice Records, (split LP with Jawbox)
Boat in the Smoke (2004), Live DVD – Punkervision
Live in Melbourne – Viva La Arthouse (2011), Big Ugly Fish Recordings/No Idea Records/Poison City Records/Punk in Ya Face
Razor Blades And Aspirin: 1990-1993 (2015), Fire Records (Record Store Day 2015 release)

Singles and EPs
"Beerpig" – Meantime Records (1990)
"Razor Blades And Aspirin" – Roughneck Records (1990)
"Smokey Joe" – Roughneck Records (1990)
"Not Superstitious" – Roughneck Records (1991)
"I Want The Moon" – Roughneck Records (1991)
"Compact & Bijou" – Roughneck Records (1992)
"Hops & Barley" – Clawfist Records (1992) (split 7-inch with Wat Tyler)
"Eagle" – Blackbox Records (1992)
"Do the Right Thing" – Roughneck Records (1993)
"Mackem Bastards" – Rugger Bugger Discs (1994)
"Little White God" – Domino Records (1994)
"Bonus Live" – Deranged Records (2003)

Additionally, there was a limited edition single that came packaged with some copies of the vinyl edition of the Minx album, containing the songs "Dreaming" and "Can't Help Falling in Love".

Promotional videos
 Discipline (1989)
 Peasant in Paradise (1990)
 Razorblades and Aspirin (1990)
 Talkin' 'bout a Revolution (1992)
 Do the Right Thing (1993)

Compilation appearances
Seconds Out, Round One, Imaginary Records, 1992. Tracks:"Not Superstitious", "One To Say", "Discipline".
Going Underground, Eurostar Records, 1992. Track: "I Want the Moon".
The Pretty and the Vacant, Released Emotions. Track: "Melody Lee" (by The Damned)
Punk-Past, Present and Future, Released Emotions. Track: "Melody Lee"  by The Damned
Another Kind Of Noise, Continental Records, 1992. Track: "I Want the Moon".
Kill The Flippers With Guitar, Vinyl Japan, 1992. Tracks: "Springtime" and "Colorado Joe / Leningrad Vlad".
Rough Trade Volume 5, Rough Trade Records, 1993. Track: "Do the Right Thing".
Independent Top 20, Beechwood Music, 1993. Track: "I Want the Moon".
Fire Is Good, Fire Records. Tracks: "Eagle" (by ABBA) and "Dreaming".
Weird and Wonderful, Rough Trade Records, 1993. Track: "Springtime".
Metal CD Volume 8, Mayking Records. Track: "Fat, Earthy, Flirt".
For A Fistful Of Yens!, Bitzcore Records, 1994. Track: "Animal Day".
Mackem Music – The Sound Of Sunderland. Track: "I Can't Help Falling in Love with You" (by Elvis).
Rejected Volume II, Rejected Records. Track: "Peasant In Paradise" (Live version recorded in Dublin in 1993)
Der F.C. St. Pauli ist schuld dass ich so bin, Bitzcore Records, 1998. Track: "Hops And St. Pauli!"
We Are The People : A Tribute to the Angelic Upstarts, Knock Out Records, 1998. Track: "Teenage Warning" (by Angelic Upstarts).
We Deliver The Goods, Cargo Records, 1999. Track: "Andy".
Greetings From The Welfare State, BYO Records, 1999. Track: "Boogie On Down".
Ritalin Riot 2, ADD Records. Track: "Grip".
I Wouldn't Piss On It If It Was On Fire, Fire Records, 2000. Track: "I Want the Moon".
BYO Records Sampler 2001, BYO Records, 2001. Track: Little White God".
Planet Of Punks Volume 2, Straight Ahead Record, 2002. Track: Little White God".
Sample This, Too!, BYO Records, 2002. Leatherface track: "Andy".
Rejected Volume III, Rejected Records, 2003. Track: "All I Need".
BYO Records 2004 Spring Sampler, BYO Records, 2004. Track: "Plastic Surgery".
Punk In Sunderland Volume 2, Stretch Records, 2004. Tracks: "Eagle" (by ABBA) and "Moon River" (by Andy Williams).
Poison The World, Poison City Records, 2005. Track: "Hoodlum".

References

External links

 Official Leatherface site
 [ Allmusic]
 Interview With Late Night Wallflower 2008 (Dickie Hammond and Graeme Philliskirk)
Mush review
 

Leatherface (band)
Musical groups from Sunderland